Logic programming is a programming paradigm that includes languages based on formal logic, including Datalog and Prolog. This article describes the syntax and semantics of the purely declarative subset of these languages. Confusingly, the name "logic programming" also refers to a  programming language that roughly corresponds to the declarative subset of Prolog. Unfortunately, the term must be used in both senses in this article.

Declarative logic programs consist entirely of rules of the form

H :- B1, ..., BN.

Each such rule can be read as an implication:

meaning "If each  is true, then  is true". Logic programs compute the set of facts that are implied by their rules.

Many implementations of Datalog, Prolog, and related languages add procedural features such as Prolog's cut operator or extra-logical features such as a foreign function interface. The formal semantics of such extensions are beyond the scope of this article.

Datalog 

The simplest widely-studied logic programming language is called Datalog. There are three major definitions of the semantics of Datalog, and they are all equivalent. The syntax and semantics of other logic programming languages are extensions and generalizations of those of Datalog.

Syntax 

A Datalog program consists of a list of rules (Horn clauses). If constant and variable are two countable sets of constants and variables respectively and relation is a countable set of predicate symbols, then the following BNF grammar expresses the structure of a Datalog program:

<program> ::= <rule> <program> | ""
<rule> ::= <atom> ":-" <atom-list> "."
<atom> ::= <relation> "(" <term-list> ")"
<atom-list> ::= <atom> | <atom> "," <atom-list> | ""
<term> ::= <constant> | <variable>
<term-list> ::= <term> | <term> "," <term-list> | ""

Every Datalog program must satisfy the condition that every variable that appears in the head of a rule also appears in the body (this condition is sometimes called the ).

Rules with empty bodies are called . For example, the following rule is a fact:
r(x) :- .

Syntactic sugar 

Many implementations of logic programming extend the above grammar to allow writing facts without the :-, like so:

r(x).

Many also allow writing 0-ary relations without parentheses, like so:

p :- q.

These are merely abbreviations (syntactic sugar); they have no impact on the semantics of the program.

Example 

The following program computes the relation path, which is the transitive closure of the relation edge.
edge(x, y).
edge(y, z).
path(A, B) :- 
  edge(A, B).
path(A, C) :- 
  path(A, B), 
  edge(B, C).

Semantics 

There are three widely-used approaches to the semantics of Datalog programs: model-theoretic, fixed-point, and proof-theoretic. These three approaches can be proven to be equivalent.

An atom is called  if none of its subterms are variables. Intuitively, each of the semantics define the meaning of a program to be the set of all ground atoms that can be deduced from the rules of the program, starting from the facts.

Model theoretic 

A rule is called ground if all of its atoms (head and body) are ground. A ground rule R1 is a ground instance of another rule R2 if R1 is the result of a substitution of constants for all the variables in R2.

The Herbrand base of a Datalog program is the set of all ground atoms that can be made with the constants appearing in the program. An interpretation (also known as a database instance) is a subset of the Herbrand base.

Model-theoretic semantics state that the meaning of a Datalog program is its minimal model (equivalently, the intersection of all its models).

For example, this program:

edge(x, y).
edge(y, z).
path(A, B) :- 
  edge(A, B).
path(A, C) :- 
  path(A, B), 
  edge(B, C).

has this Herbrand universe: x, y, z

and this Herbrand base: edge(x, x), edge(x, y), ..., edge(z, z), path(x, x), ..., path(z, z)

and this minimal Herbrand model: edge(x, y), edge(y, z), path(x, y), path(y, z), path(x, z)

Fixed-point 

Let  be the set of interpretations of a Datalog program P, that is, where H is the Herbrand base of P and P is the powerset operator. By the Knaster–Tarski theorem, this map has a least fixed point; by the Kleene fixed-point theorem the fixed point is the supremum of the chain . The least fixed point of  coincides with the minimal Herbrand model of the program.

The fixpoint semantics suggest an algorithm for computing the minimal Herbrand model: Start with the set of ground facts in the program, then repeatedly add consequences of the rules until a fixpoint is reached. This algorithm is called naïve evaluation.

Proof-theoretic 

G :- A1, …, An.

The proof-theoretic semantics defines the meaning of a Datalog program to be the set of ground atoms that can be defived from such trees. This set coincides with the minimal Herbrand model.

One might be interested in knowing whether or not a particular ground atom appears in the minimal Herbrand model of a Datalog program, perhaps without caring much about the rest of the model. A top-down reading of the proof trees described above suggests an algorithm for computing the results of such queries, such a reading informs the SLD resolution algorithm, which forms the basis for the evaluation of Prolog.

Other approaches 

The semantics of Datalog have also been studied in the context of fixpoints over more general semirings.

Logic programming 

While the name "logic programming" is used to refer to the entire paradigm of programming languages including Datalog and Prolog, when discussing formal semantics, it generally refers to an extension of Datalog with function symbols. Logic programs are also called . Logic programming as discussed in this article is closely related to the "pure" or declarative subset of Prolog.

Syntax 

The syntax of logic programming extends the syntax of Datalog with function symbols. Logic programming drops the range restriction, allowing variables to appear in the heads of rules that do not appear in their bodies.

Semantics 

Due to the presence of function symbols, the Herbrand models of logic programs can be infinite. However, the semantics of a logic program is still defined to be its minimal Herbrand model. Relatedly, the fixpoint of the immediate consequence operator may not converge in a finite number of steps (or to a finite set). However, any ground atom in the minimal Herbrand model will have a finite proof tree. This is why Prolog is evaluated top-down. Just as in Datalog, the three semantics can be proven equivalent.

Negation 

Logic programming has the desirable property that all three major definitions of the semantics of logic programs agree. In contrast, there are many conflicting proposals for the semantics of logic programs with negation. The source of the disagreement is that logic programs have a unique minimal Herbrand model, but in general, logic programming (or even Datalog) programs with negation do not.

Syntax 

Negation is written not, and can appear in front of any atom in the body of a rule.

<atom-list> ::= <atom> | "not" <atom> | <atom> "," <atom-list> | ""

Semantics

Stratified negation 

The model-theoretic and fixed-point semantics of Datalog can be extended to handle stratified negation, and such extensions can be proved equivalent.

Many implementations of Datalog use a bottom-up evaluation model inspired by the fixed point semantics. Since this semantics can handle stratified negation, several implementations of Datalog implement stratified negation.

While stratified negation is a common extension to Datalog, there are reasonable programs that cannot be stratified. The following program describes a two-player game where a player wins if their opponent has no moves:

move(a, b).
win(X) :- move(X, Y), not win(Y).

This program is not stratified, but it seems reasonable to think that a should win the game.

Completion semantics

Perfect model semantics

Stable model semantics 

The stable model semantics define a condition for calling certain Herbrand models of a program stable. Intuitively, stable models are the "possible sets of beliefs that a rational agent might hold, given [the program]" as premises.

A program with negation may have many stable models or no stable models. For instance, the program

p :- not q.
q :- not p.

has two stable models , . The one-rule program

p :- not p.

has no stable models.

Every stable model is a minimal Herbrand model. A Datalog program without negation has a single stable model, which is exactly its minimal Herbrand model. 
The stable model semantics defines the meaning of a logic program with negation to be its stable model, if there is exactly one. However, it can be useful to investigate  (or at least, several) of the stable models of a program; this is the goal of answer set programming.

Well-founded semantics

Further extensions 

Several other extensions of Datalog have been proposed and studied, including variants with support for integer constants and functions (including Datalogℤ), inequality constraints in the bodies of rules, and aggregate functions.

Constraint logic programming allows for constraints over domains such as the reals or integers to appear in the bodies of rules.

See also 

 Herbrand structure
 Logic programming
 Negation as failure
 Prolog syntax and semantics

References

Notes

Sources 

Programming language syntax
Logic programming